Celia Kaye (born Celia Kay Burkholder; February 24, 1942) is an American actress. She is most famous for her starring role in the 1964 film adaptation of Island of the Blue Dolphins which won her a Golden Globe award.

Early life 
Kaye is of German and Cherokee ancestry and was born in Carthage, Missouri, to chemical engineer John W. Burkholder and his wife, Kathryn, who ran a private preschool. When she was one year old her family moved to Wilmington, Delaware, where her younger brother Johnny was born. She graduated with honors from Henry C. Conrad High School (now Conrad Schools of Science), where she showed an early interest in acting as a member of the National Thespian Society. In addition to her performing arts interests, which included learning dance and organ, she toured regionally as a diver and exhibition swimmer with the Wilmington swim club. She also worked as a model and is a graduate of the Philadelphia Modeling and Charm School.

Career 
In 1959 Kaye moved to California, where she won a scholarship to the Pasadena Playhouse, graduating in 1961. She soon moved from the stage to television with a major role in the sitcom The New Loretta Young Show. Her role on this show, as Loretta Young's daughter, Marnie, almost didn't happen as the role was originally cast with Portland Mason who was later fired. While working on the show she continued her education, attending Los Angeles City College at night and studying modern jazz at Eugene Loring's American School of Dance.

Kaye became a movie star when she landed the lead role of Karana in the 1964 movie Island of the Blue Dolphins, based on the book of the same name. There were originally 1,500 applicants for the role she was ultimately chosen for. Although her Cherokee heritage wasn't known by the producer at the time she was cast, the press for the movie played it up, drawing attention to the fact that she looked "like an Indian with her dark hair and skin". When filming was done, Kaye remained and followed along with the post-production of her first feature film. Before her first movie was even released, she filmed two more projects for Universal Pictures as part of a seven year contract: Wild Seed and Fluffy.

Following the release of Island of the Blue Dolphins, she was awarded the Golden Globe Award for Most Promising Newcomer in 1965, alongside Mia Farrow and Mary Ann Mobley. The movie itself received generally positive reviews as an entertaining but simplistic children's movie although her performance received more mixed reviews. Stanley Eichelbaum of the San Francisco Examiner called her performance two-dimensional, while Mae Tinee of the Chicago Tribune wrote that she "handles a difficult role with grace and ease."

Over the next few years, she appeared in a number of additional movies, television shows, and plays. She attended UCLA in the evenings, studying anthropology and social sciences. After the 1960s her roles became less frequent and smaller, including being a look-alike extra for Merle Oberon on The Day of The Locust. By 1978 she was referred to as a "former actress", although she has continued to have occasional roles.

Personal life 
Kaye married director John Milius on February 26, 1978. They had one child together and remain friends, although they were divorced by 1987.

Filmography

Television

Film

References

External links 
 
 
 Celia Kaye Tribute to Loretta Young
 An Interview with Celia Kaye, Actress Who Played Karana

1942 births
Living people
20th-century American actresses
21st-century American actresses
Actresses from Missouri
Actresses from Wilmington, Delaware
American film actresses
American people of Cherokee descent
American people of German descent
American television actresses
People from Carthage, Missouri